Lincoln Park is a borough in Morris County, New Jersey, United States. As of the 2010 United States census, the borough's population was 10,521, reflecting a decline of 409 (−3.7%) from the 10,930 counted in the 2000 Census, which had in turn declined by 48 (−0.4%) from the 10,978 counted in the 1990 Census.

Lincoln Park was incorporated as a borough by an act of the New Jersey Legislature on March 11, 1922, from portions of Pequannock Township. The borough was reincorporated on February 26, 1925. The borough was named for President Abraham Lincoln.

New Jersey Monthly magazine ranked Lincoln Park as its 5th best place to live in its 2008 rankings of the "Best Places To Live" in the state.

Geography

The municipality contains the easternmost point in Morris County, which is located along the Pompton River.

According to the United States Census Bureau, the borough had a total area of 6.91 square miles (17.91 km2), including 6.40 square miles (16.57 km2) of land and 0.52 square miles (1.34 km2) of water (7.47%).

The borough borders Kinnelon, Montville and Pequannock Township in Morris County; Fairfield Township in Essex County; and Wayne in Passaic County.

Demographics

Census 2010

The Census Bureau's 2006–2010 American Community Survey showed that (in 2010 inflation-adjusted dollars) median household income was $87,530 (with a margin of error of +/− $5,142) and the median family income was $98,709 (+/− $5,538). Males had a median income of $71,440 (+/− $4,204) versus $56,761 (+/− $3,088) for females. The per capita income for the borough was $38,807 (+/− $2,824). About 4.3% of families and 4.6% of the population were below the poverty line, including 12.3% of those under age 18 and 1.9% of those age 65 or over.

Census 2000
As of the 2000 United States census there were 10,930 people, 4,026 households, and 2,705 families residing in the borough. The population density was 1,624.2 people per square mile (627.1/km2). There were 4,110 housing units at an average density of 610.8 per square mile (235.8/km2). The racial makeup of the borough was 90.07% White, 1.75% African American, 0.12% Native American, 5.29% Asian, 0.01% Pacific Islander, 1.30% from other races, and 1.46% from two or more races. Hispanic or Latino people of any race were 5.79% of the population.

There were 4,026 households, out of which 29.3% had children under the age of 18 living with them, 55.2% were married couples living together, 9.2% had a female householder with no husband present, and 32.8% were non-families. 26.6% of all households were made up of individuals, and 6.9% had someone living alone who was 65 years of age or older. The average household size was 2.54 and the average family size was 3.14.

In the borough, the population was spread out, with 20.3% under the age of 18, 5.8% from 18 to 24, 33.7% from 25 to 44, 25.4% from 45 to 64, and 14.8% who were 65 years of age or older. The median age was 40 years. For every 100 females, there were 92.1 males. For every 100 females age 18 and over, there were 87.8 males.

The median income for a household in the borough was $69,050, and the median income for a family was $77,307. Males had a median income of $51,651 versus $36,292 for females. The per capita income for the borough was $30,389. About 1.9% of families and 2.8% of the population were below the poverty line, including 2.7% of those under age 18 and 5.9% of those age 65 or over.

Government

Local government
The Borough of Lincoln Park is governed within the Faulkner Act (formally known as the Optional Municipal Charter Law) under the Mayor-Council Plan F system of municipal government, implemented based on the recommendations of a Charter Study Commission as of January 1, 1971. The borough is one of 71 municipalities (of the 564) statewide that use this form of government. The governing body is comprised of the Mayor and the seven-member Borough Council, with three council seats elected at-large and four from wards, with all positions chosen in partisan elections held in even-numbered years as part of the November general election. Each council member is elected to a four-year term on a staggered basis, with the four ward seats up for vote simultaneously and the three at-large seats and the mayoral seat up for election together two years later.

, the Mayor of Lincoln Park is Republican David A. Runfeldt, whose term of office ends on December 31, 2022. Members of the Borough Council are Council President Andrew Seise (R; at-large, 2022), Patrick Antonetti (D; Ward III, 2024), Gary Gemian (R; Ward I, 2024), Joseph Gurkovich (R, Ward IV, 2024; appointed to serve an unexpired term), Daniel W. Moeller (R; at-large, 2022), Ellen Ross (R; Ward II, 2024) and Ann Thompson (R; at-large, 2022).

In October 2021, the Borough Council appointed Joseph Gurkovich to fill the Ward IV seat expiring in December 2024 that had been held by James A. Wild the previous month after having served more than 30 years in office. Gurkovich will serve on an interim basis until the November 2022 general election, when voters will choose a candidate to serve the balance of the term of office.

Federal, state and county representation
Lincoln Park is located in the 11th Congressional District and is part of New Jersey's 26th state legislative district.

 

Morris County is governed by a Board of County Commissioners comprised of seven members who are elected at-large in partisan elections to three-year terms on a staggered basis, with either one or three seats up for election each year as part of the November general election. Actual day-to-day operation of departments is supervised by County Administrator, John Bonanni. , Morris County's Commissioners are
Commissioner Director Tayfun Selen (R, Chatham Township, term as commissioner ends December 31, 2023; term as director ends 2022),
Commissioner Deputy Director John Krickus (R, Washington Township, term as commissioner ends 2024; term as deputy director ends 2022),
Douglas Cabana (R, Boonton Township, 2022), 
Kathryn A. DeFillippo (R, Roxbury, 2022),
Thomas J. Mastrangelo (R, Montville, 2022),
Stephen H. Shaw (R, Mountain Lakes, 2024) and
Deborah Smith (R, Denville, 2024).
The county's constitutional officers are the County Clerk and County Surrogate (both elected for five-year terms of office) and the County Sheriff (elected for a three-year term). , they are 
County Clerk Ann F. Grossi (R, Parsippany–Troy Hills, 2023),
Sheriff James M. Gannon (R, Boonton Township, 2022) and
Surrogate Heather Darling (R, Roxbury, 2024).

Politics
As of March 23, 2011, there were a total of 6,421 registered voters in Lincoln Park, of which 1,371 (21.4%) were registered as Democrats, 2,088 (32.5%) were registered as Republicans and 2,955 (46.0%) were registered as Unaffiliated. There were 7 voters registered as Libertarians or Greens.

In the 2012 presidential election, Republican Mitt Romney received 53.4% of the vote (2,301 cast), ahead of Democrat Barack Obama with 45.7% (1,967 votes), and other candidates with 0.9% (39 votes), among the 4,340 ballots cast by the borough's 6,735 registered voters (33 ballots were spoiled), for a turnout of 64.4%. In the 2008 presidential election, Republican John McCain received 53.2% of the vote (2,745 cast), ahead of Democrat Barack Obama with 44.8% (2,311 votes) and other candidates with 1.3% (69 votes), among the 5,162 ballots cast by the borough's 6,711 registered voters, for a turnout of 76.9%. In the 2004 presidential election, Republican George W. Bush received 56.9% of the vote (2,767 ballots cast), outpolling Democrat John Kerry with 42.1% (2,047 votes) and other candidates with 0.6% (40 votes), among the 4,864 ballots cast by the borough's 6,635 registered voters, for a turnout percentage of 73.3.

In the 2013 gubernatorial election, Republican Chris Christie received 68.0% of the vote (1,857 cast), ahead of Democrat Barbara Buono with 29.9% (818 votes), and other candidates with 2.1% (57 votes), among the 2,783 ballots cast by the borough's 6,632 registered voters (51 ballots were spoiled), for a turnout of 42.0%. In the 2009 gubernatorial election, Republican Chris Christie received 56.7% of the vote (1,762 ballots cast), ahead of  Democrat Jon Corzine with 34.8% (1,081 votes), Independent Chris Daggett with 7.3% (226 votes) and other candidates with 0.9% (28 votes), among the 3,108 ballots cast by the borough's 6,518 registered voters, yielding a 47.7% turnout.

Education
The Lincoln Park Public Schools serves students in pre-kindergarten through eighth grade. As of the 2018–19 school year, the district, comprised of two schools, had an enrollment of 914 students and 82.4 classroom teachers (on an FTE basis), for a student–teacher ratio of 11.1:1. Schools in the district (with 2018–19 enrollment data from the National Center for Education Statistics) are 
Lincoln Park Elementary School with 488 students in grades Pre-K–4 and 
Lincoln Park Middle School with 421 students in grades 5–8.

For ninth through twelfth grades, Lincoln Park public school students attend Boonton High School in Boonton as part of a sending/receiving relationship with the Boonton Public Schools, with Lincoln Park students accounting for a majority of students at the high school. As of the 2018–19 school year, the high school had an enrollment of 643 students and 56.3 classroom teachers (on an FTE basis), for a student–teacher ratio of 11.4:1. The two districts have sought to sever the more-than-50-year-old relationship, citing cost savings that could be achieved by both districts and complaints by Lincoln Park that it is granted only one seat on the Boonton Public Schools' Board of Education, less than the number of seats that would be allocated based on the percentage of students of population. In April 2006, the Commissioner of the New Jersey Department of Education rejected the request. As of 2015–2016 there were about 70 students from the borough attending the academy programs of the Morris County Vocational School District, which are the Morris County School of Technology in Denville; The Academy for Mathematics, Science, and Engineering in Rockaway at Morris Hills High School; and the Academy for Law and Public Safety in Butler at Butler High School.

Lincoln Park was formerly the home for The Craig School, a private coeducational day school serving students in second through twelfth grade. The school has an enrollment of 160 students split between the Lower School (grades 3–8), in Mountain Lakes, and the Upper School (grades 9–12), located in Lincoln Park until the end of the 2012–2013 school year. As of September 2013, the Craig School high school program is located at Boonton High School.

Transportation

Roads and highways

The main highway providing service to Lincoln Park is U.S. Route 202. County Route 504 and County Route 511 Alternate also traverse the borough. New Jersey Route 23 and Interstate 80 are major highways accessible in neighboring Wayne Township.

Public transportation
NJ Transit provides train service at the Lincoln Park station providing service on the Montclair-Boonton Line to Newark Broad Street Station and New York Penn Station, with connecting service to Hoboken Terminal.

NJ Transit provides local bus service on the 871 route. NJ Transit had provided service on the MCM1 route until 2010, when subsidies to the local provider were eliminated as part of budget cuts.

Lakeland Bus Lines offers limited service on its Route 46 route between Dover and the Port Authority Bus Terminal in Midtown Manhattan.

Media
Lincoln Park is served by New York City television stations. It is served by the newspapers The Star-Ledger, Daily Record and The Record.

Notable people

People who were born in, residents of, or otherwise closely associated with Lincoln Park include:
 Angelo Badalamenti (1937–2022), film composer/arranger, best known for his theme music for the TV series Twin Peaks
 Lauren English (born 1989), competitive swimmer who represented the United States at the Pan Pacific Championships (2006) and the World University Games (2007)
 A. J. Khubani, founder, president, and CEO of Telebrands Corp.
 Jim Kiick (1946–2020), NFL halfback best known for his play with the Miami Dolphins
 Eric Klenofsky (born 1994), soccer player who currently plays for Richmond Kickers of the United Soccer League on loan from D.C. United of Major League Soccer
 Edgar Maass (1896–1964), German-American novelist of historical fiction
 William A. Mitchell (1911–2004), inventor of Pop Rocks and Tang
 James N. Post III, former United States Air Force officer who served as Director of the United States Air Forces Central Command's Air and Space Operations Center
 Amzi Emmons Zeliff (1831–1915), businessman and folk painter

References

External links

 
1922 establishments in New Jersey
Boroughs in Morris County, New Jersey
Faulkner Act (mayor–council)
Populated places established in 1922